The Madera Canal is a -long aqueduct in the U.S. state of California. It is part of the Central Valley Project managed by the United States Bureau of Reclamation to convey water north to augment irrigation capacity in Madera County. It was also the subject of the United States Supreme Court's decision in Central Green Co. v. United States.

The Madera Canal begins at Millerton Lake, a reservoir on the San Joaquin River north of Fresno. The canal runs north along the eastern edge of the San Joaquin Valley, ending at the Chowchilla River east of Chowchilla.

It was completed in 1945. The headworks was rebuilt in 1965 to deliver .

References
 Central Valley Project - Friant Division, Bureau of Reclamation
 USGS flow data
 

Agriculture in California
Transportation buildings and structures in Madera County, California
Central Valley Project
Irrigation in the United States
Aqueducts in California
San Joaquin River
United States Bureau of Reclamation
1945 establishments in California
Infrastructure completed in 1945